Narok South is an electoral constituency in Kenya. It is one of six constituencies of Narok County. The constituency was established for the 1966 elections. The constituency has 6 wards, all electing Member of the County Assembly (MCA) for the Narok County Assembly.

Members of Parliament

Wards

References 

Constituencies in Narok County
Constituencies in Rift Valley Province
1966 establishments in Kenya
Constituencies established in 1966